Kim So-Jung (born 3 March 1986) is a South Korean former tennis player. Her highest WTA singles ranking is 204, which she achieved on 20 September 2010. Her career-high in doubles is 233, which she reached on July 17, 2006. She won silver for the mixed-doubles teams event, defeating the Taiwanese team at the 2009 Universiade Games. She has also played at the Korea Open.

ITF Circuit finals

Singles: 7 (5–2)

Doubles: 13 (8–5)

References

External links
 
 

1986 births
Living people
South Korean female tennis players
Tennis players at the 2010 Asian Games
Asian Games medalists in tennis
Tennis players at the 2006 Asian Games
Medalists at the 2010 Asian Games
Asian Games bronze medalists for South Korea
Universiade medalists in tennis
Universiade silver medalists for South Korea
21st-century South Korean women